"Kuiama" is a song written by Jeff Lynne and performed by Electric Light Orchestra. Singer Jeff Lynne pronounces it 'Ki-ama'.

The song is the last track of the ELO 2 LP. At 11:19, it is the longest track on the album, and the longest song ever recorded by Electric Light Orchestra. It tells the tale of a soldier and an orphan girl. The soldier is trying to comfort the girl and also to explain how he was the one who killed her parents.

Although not released as a single, the song has been included on compilation albums, such as Olé ELO, Afterglow and The Light Shines On Vol 2, and has been performed live. It was also a favourite of the ELO band members at the time.

"This one, without doubt, is the favourite of all the band. It's a sad story about a war orphan with a soldier explaining to her all about the war—and that it was he that killed her parents. The most sensitive thing we do."—Bev Bevan (1973, Birmingham Post & Mail article entitled: Chart Boost Coming For Brum And E.L.O.)

"I like Kuiama even though the opening reminds me of the opening of You Only Live Twice."—Wilfred Gibson.

"That aside, however, we still have only a tenuously connected group of songs, as opposed to anything on the order of 'Kuiama,' on the last album, which used its length and the group's unique approach to music to achieve real emotional impact."—Greg Shaw

References

Electric Light Orchestra songs
Song recordings produced by Jeff Lynne
Anti-war songs
Songs written by Jeff Lynne
1973 songs